Peter Frank Radford (born 20 September 1939) is a former British athlete, who competed at 100 and 200 metres (and 100 and 220 yards), broke world records, and won Olympic medals, despite having been seriously ill as a child due to a hole in his kidney.

Career

Running
Radford took up competitive running at the age of 12, soon joining Birchfield Harriers, where he was coached by Bill Marlow, and won the English Schools intermediate 100 yard title in 1955 and seniors 100 yards in 1957. He attended Tettenhall College. At the age of 18 at the British Empire and Commonwealth Games in Cardiff in July 1958, he came fourth at 100 yards, was a semi-finalist in the 220 yards, and won a sprint relay gold medal with the England 4×110 yards relay team.

In August of that year he competed in the European Championships where he won a Bronze medal in the 100 metres and a Silver medal as part of the British 4×100 metres relay team. In September of the same year he equalled the European record of 20.8 seconds for 200m in Paris. On 28 May 1960, he broke the world record for 220 yards with a time of 20.5 seconds, at the Staffordshire Championships in Wolverhampton. The time and record were also accepted for the 200 metre distance.

He represented Great Britain in the 100 and 200 metres at the 1960 Summer Olympics held in Rome, Italy, where he won the bronze medal at 100 metres. He then teamed up with fellow British athletes David Jones, David Segal and Nick Whitehead to finish third in the 4×100 metres relay. The USA finished first in that race but were disqualified for a baton exchange outside the permitted zone which then elevated Britain to third. Videos show that Radford's baton pass to David Jones at the first changeover was also outside the permitted zone so the Britons were fortunate not to be disqualified as well.

Radford won a second British Empire and Commonwealth Games Gold medal in Perth, Western Australia in 1962 as a member of the England 4×110 yards relay team, and represented Britain as a quarter-finalist at both 100m and 200m at the 1964 Tokyo Olympics, albeit as a late selection. He was eliminated from the 100m in the second-round heats, but ran the first leg of the relay, which broke the UK record. Following Tokyo, he retired from competition, due to a recurring knee ligament problem. At that time, and for at least another two decades, he was the most successful sprinter in Birchfield Harriers' history.

Administrator and writer
For 12 years from 1965, he lived and worked in Canada and the USA.

He is a former Chairman of UK Athletics and chairman (in 1993) and 'executive between chairman' (1994–97) of its predecessor, the British Athletics Federation. He was founder professor of the chair of the department of physical education and sports science at Glasgow University, and is currently Professor of Sport at Brunel University. In the fall of 2018, Radford was in-residence as a short-term fellow at the Folger Library's Folger Institute in Washington, DC, to study and present on "the corporeal and sporting early modern woman."

Radford wrote a biography of the 19th-century Scottish athlete Robert Barclay Allardice, entitled The celebrated Captain Barclay: sport, money and fame in Regency Britain and published in 2001.

A photograph of him running against Italy, three months before the 1960 Olympics, is featured on the cover of the 2011/2012 BT telephone directory, The Phone Book, for Birmingham North, which covers the home of Birchfield Harriers, Perry Barr Stadium.

References

1939 births
Living people
Sportspeople from Walsall
English male sprinters
Olympic athletes of Great Britain
Athletes (track and field) at the 1960 Summer Olympics
Athletes (track and field) at the 1964 Summer Olympics
Commonwealth Games medallists in athletics
Olympic bronze medallists for Great Britain
Athletes (track and field) at the 1958 British Empire and Commonwealth Games
Athletes (track and field) at the 1962 British Empire and Commonwealth Games
Commonwealth Games gold medallists for England
European Athletics Championships medalists
World record setters in athletics (track and field)
Birchfield Harriers
People educated at Tettenhall College
Academics of the University of Glasgow
Academics of Brunel University London
English sportswriters
Sports historians
English male non-fiction writers
Medalists at the 1960 Summer Olympics
Olympic bronze medalists in athletics (track and field)
Medallists at the 1958 British Empire and Commonwealth Games
Medallists at the 1962 British Empire and Commonwealth Games